Knights of the Teutonic Order (Polish: Krzyżacy) is a 1960 Polish film directed by Aleksander Ford based on the novel of the same name by Henryk Sienkiewicz.

The plot is situated in the late-14th century and early-15th century Poland and centers on the Polish–Lithuanian–Teutonic War (1409-1411) and the final Battle of Grunwald (1410). 15,000 extras were employed to create the battle scenes. The film attracted to cinema masses of viewers and remains one of the most attended films in Polish history: it sold 2 million tickets within several months, 14 million after four years and as of 1987, it had some 32,315,695 admissions. It was also exported to forty-six foreign countries, and sold 29.6 million tickets in the Soviet Union and 2,650,700 in the Czechoslovak Socialist Republic, and was the most successful Polish film internationally. It was a Polish submission to the 33rd Academy Awards.

It was released on 15 July 1960, the 550th anniversary of the battle of Grunwald.

Cast 
 Grażyna Staniszewska as Danusia Jurandówna
 Urszula Modrzyńska as Jagienka ze Zgorzelic
 Mieczysław Kalenik as Zbyszko z Bogdańca
 Aleksander Fogiel as Maćko z Bogdańca
 Andrzej Szalawski as Jurand ze Spychowa
 Leon Niemczyk as Fulko de Lorche
 Henryk Borowski as Zygfryd de Löwe
 Mieczysław Voit as Kuno von Lichtenstein
 Tadeusz Białoszczyński as Duke Janusz I of Warsaw
 Stanisław Jasiukiewicz as Grand Master of the Teutonic Knights Ulrich von Jungingen
 Emil Karewicz as King Władysław Jagiełło
 Józef Kostecki as Lithuanian duke Witold
 Janusz Strachocki as Grand Master of the Teutonic Knights Konrad von Jungingen
 Lucyna Winnicka as Duchess Anna Danuta, wife of Janusz I of Warsaw
 Cezary Julski as Zawisza Czarny
 Jerzy Kozakiewicz as Cztan z Rogowa
 Janusz Paluszkiewicz as royal marshall
 Jerzy Pichelski as Powala of Taczew

References

External links 
 
 Krzyżacy at FilmPolski.pl

1960 films
1960s historical films
Polish historical films
1960s Polish-language films
Films based on works by Henryk Sienkiewicz
Films directed by Aleksander Ford
Films set in the 1400s
Films set in the 1410s
Films set in the 14th century
Films set in Poland
War epic films
Films based on actual events
Films based on Polish novels
Cultural depictions of Jan Žižka
Polish epic films